The 1994 NCAA Division I women's basketball tournament featured 64 teams for the first time ever. The Final Four consisted of North Carolina, Purdue, Louisiana Tech, and Alabama, with North Carolina defeating Louisiana Tech 60–59 to win its first NCAA title on a 3-point shot by Charlotte Smith as time expired. The ball was inbounded with only 00:00.7 left on the clock, making it one of the most exciting finishes in tournament history.

Notable events

The Alabama team was a six seed in the Midwest region. After beating the 11 seed Oregon State, they faced a higher seed, Iowa, who were seeded third in the region. Alabama won that game, and went on to face another higher seed in Texas Tech, the defending national champions. Alabama won again, and went on to face Penn State, the top seed in the region. Alabama won yet again, this time by 14 points, to advance to their first final Four.

In the semi-final game of the Final Four, they faced Louisiana Tech, a team they had played earlier in the year. In their December match-up, Alabama had beaten the Lady Techsters by 22 points, 99–77. In this game La tech opened up a six-point lead at the half. Alabama's All-American guard Niesa Johnson cut her hand on a locker room sink, which required seven stitches. Because it was such an important game, Johnson was bandaged and medicated and returned to the game. The Alabama team fought back from an eleven-point deficit and cut the margin to two points with seconds to play. The plan was to get the ball to Betsy Harris to attempt a three-point play, but Harris stepped out of bounds. After a made free throw, they had one more chance with a three-point attempt but it failed, and La Tech moved on to the championship game.

In the other semifinal game, the North Carolina team faced Purdue. North Carolina's Charlotte Smith was expected to be an important key to the game, and the Purdue coach, Lin Dunn, tried to prepare the team to handle Smith. That planning was ineffective, as Smith scored 23 points, and set a personal career records for assists with eight. The Purdue team was down 13 points in the first half, but fought back and managed to take a two-point lead in the second half. However, the Tar Heels switched to a zone defense after made baskets, and retook the lead, ending up with an 89–74 victory, and the first North Carolina team to make it to the Championship game.

In addition to Charlotte Smith, North Carolina had a freshman guard Marion Jones who would later be known for world class performances in track and field. Jones picked up her third foul only six minutes in the game and had to sit. This "rattled" the North Carolina team but they kept the game close. When the game drew to a close, the La Tech team had a two-point advantage with less than a second on the clock, but North Carolina had the ball. With 0.7 seconds left, there was just enough time to catch and shoot. The ball was inbounded to Charlotte Smith who had made only eight three-pointers on 31 attempts during the season. Smith launched the ball, but never saw what happened as her vision was blocked. Her teammates mobbed her, and she realized she had hit the shot to complete one of the most dramatic finishes in NCAA Championship history. North Carolina won the Championship 60–59.

Tournament records
 Rebounds - Charlotte Smith recorded 23 rebounds in the championship game between North Carolina and Louisiana Tech, the most number of rebounds recorded in a Final Four game. The result is also a tie for the most number of rebounds in an NCAA tournament game.
 Winning Margin - Tennessee beat North Carolina A&T by a score of 111–37. The 74 point margin is the largest ever  record in an NCAA tournament game.
 Three-point field goals - Betsy Harris scored 20 three-point attempts in the tournament, tied for the most ever scored in a complete tournament. Harris scored the baskets in five games, while the two other record holders, Diana Taurasi and Maya Moore, accomplished the feat in six games.

Qualifying teams – automatic
Sixty-four teams were selected to participate in the 1994 NCAA Tournament. Thirty-two conferences were eligible for an automatic bid to the 1994 NCAA tournament.

Qualifying teams – at-large
Thirty-two additional teams were selected to complete the sixty-four invitations.

Bids by conference
Thirty-two conferences earned an automatic bid.  In sixteen cases, the automatic bid was the only representative from the conference. Thirty-two additional at-large teams were selected from sixteen of the conferences.

Bids by state

The sixty-four teams came from thirty-six states, plus Washington, D.C. Texas had the most teams with five bids. Fourteen states did not have any teams receiving bids.

Brackets
First- and second-round games played at higher seed except where noted.

East Region

Mideast Region

Midwest Region

West Region

Final Four – Richmond, Virginia

E-East; ME-Mideast; MW-Midwest; W-West.

Record by  conference
Eighteen conferences had more than one  bid, or at least one win in NCAA Tournament play:

Fourteen conferences  went 0-1: Big South Conference, Ivy League, MAAC, MAC, MEAC, Midwestern Collegiate, North Atlantic Conference, Northeast Conference, Ohio Valley Conference, Patriot League, Southern Conference, Southland,  SWAC, and Trans America.

All-Tournament team

 Charlotte Smith, North Carolina
 Tonya Sampson, North Carolina
 Vickie Johnson, Louisiana Tech
 Pam Thomas, Louisiana Tech
 Betsy Harris, Alabama

Game officials

 Dee Kantner (semifinal)
 Violet Palmer (semifinal)
 Sally Bell (semifinal)
 Sidney Bunch (semifinal)
 Sally Bell (final)
 John Morningstar (final)

See also
 1994 NCAA Division I men's basketball tournament
 1994 NCAA Division II women's basketball tournament
 1994 NCAA Division III women's basketball tournament
 1994 NAIA Division I women's basketball tournament
 1994 NAIA Division II women's basketball tournament

References

Tournament
NCAA Division I women's basketball tournament
NCAA Division I women's basketball tournament
NCAA Division I women's basketball tournament
Basketball in Austin, Texas
Basketball in Lubbock, Texas
1994 in sports in Texas
Events in Lubbock, Texas
Sports competitions in Texas